Capparis moonii is a woody climber, belonging to the family Capparaceae which is native to India and Sri Lanka. It was described by Robert Wight in his Illustrations of Indian Botany in 1840.

References

External links

moonii
Taxa named by Robert Wight